The 1994 Munster Senior Hurling Championship Final was a hurling match played on 10 July 1994 at Semple Stadium, Thurles, County Tipperary. It was contested by Limerick and Clare. Limerick captained by Gary Kirby won the game 0-25 to 2-10 to claim their first Munster title since 1981.

References

External links
Match Highlights

Munster
Clare county hurling team matches
Limerick county hurling team matches
Munster Senior Hurling Championship Finals